"20/20" is a single by American rapper Lil Tjay, released on January 1, 2020 by Columbia Records.

Composition
The song begins with a piano introduction for about 40 seconds, before "precise bass and skittering percussion" plays in the instrumental with Lil Tjay beginning his verse. He sing-raps about his newfound fame and his desire to maintain the success of his rap career. He also shouts out to Jay-Z and repeatedly sings, "I'mma soon be the greatest."

Critical reception
Mitch Findlay of HotNewHipHop praised the song, writing that "The hypnotic instrumental provides a relaxing backdrop, and Tjay's flow remains sharp without invading the space."

Music video
A music video for the song was released on February 4, 2020. Directed by Sophie Caraan, it sees Lil Tjay in Miami via private jet, being chauffeured in expensive car and in a private yacht with his friends.

Charts

Certifications

References

2020 singles
2020 songs
Lil Tjay songs
Columbia Records singles
Songs written by Lil Tjay